Felipe Heusser (born 1980) is a Chilean activist and social entrepreneur, co-founder of Ciudadano Inteligente, a Latin American civic technology organization based in Santiago-Chile, awarded with the  2011 Golden Nica for 'Digital Communities' and the 2013 Omidyar Network Award.

Heusser is a Fellow at the Berkman Center for Internet and Society at Harvard University, where he conducts research in the topics of open government and civic technologies.

Being an Ashoka Fellow since 2010, Heusser has also co-founded the Latin American Civic-Hacking network Developing Latin America, the Chilean online radio Subela, and most recently the open live streaming network Rhinobird.tv, for which Heusser was awarded with the 2011 Knight News Challenge together with Jeffrey Warren.

Heusser is a member of the board of advisers for Code for America.

References

1980 births
Chilean activists
Living people
Ashoka Fellows